William Henry Havelock MacInnis (November 22, 1860 – November 14, 1928) was an American  politician who served as a member of the Massachusetts Senate and Mayor of Pittsfield, Massachusetts.

Notes

1860 births
1928 deaths
Mayors of Pittsfield, Massachusetts
Massachusetts state senators
People from Cape Breton Island